Union Hand-Roasted Coffee (formerly Union Coffee Roasters) is a privately owned British coffee roasting business based in East London, United Kingdom. The company was founded in 2001 by Jeremy Torz and Steven Macatonia.  Coffee House says the company "effectively bridges the definitions of independent and mainstream" as they work according to craft principles, but also sell their products in supermarkets.

The Union roastmasters stood over their Probat and Loring roasters, tending to each small batch with care. Their roastmasters are experts at bringing the best flavour out of each particular coffee (as claimed by them).

They roast all their coffee fresh to order, which means people receive it as fresh and tasty as it gets.

Hand roasted coffee is made in small batches with the direct intervention of a master coffee roaster. The master coffee roaster watches over the batch as it's roasted to make sure it's done to perfection.

History 
Working at Peet's Coffee & Tea in San Francisco in the early 1990s sparked the interest in coffee in Jeremy Torz and Stephen Macatonia, both from the UK. In stark contrast to the country's local coffee scene, which was at the time essentially nonexistent, they discovered a bustling coffee environment in the Californian metropolis.

Macatonia worked as an immunologist and Torz as an optometrist before founding the business. Both of them, however, were drawn to the coffee roasting scene and decided to stay for four years even though they had only intended to visit for six months. Over the course of four years, they learned a lot about the local coffee sector and the craft of growing and roasting coffee.

In 1994, when they were back in the UK, they decided to leave their day jobs and found Torz and Macatonia, a tiny coffee roasting business. They didn't have any prior expertise in the retail area, so they started a wholesale company.

In 1995, they became the main supplier for the Seattle Coffee Company, the first major coffee shop chain in the UK. Torz and Macatonia eventually merged with The Seattle Coffee Company in 1997  which was then acquired by Starbucks in 1998.

After some time, Jeremy and Steven left in 2000. In 2001, they founded private company Union Coffee Roasters and in 2007, it was rebranded to Union Hand-Roasted Coffee.

By 2005, the company was producing 11 different lines, four of which were special editions and seven of which were for sale in Sainsbury's, Asda, the Co-op and Somerfield.
In 2015, Union refreshed their brand to help "share the joy of good coffee". As part of this, they created a new company logo, revamped and rationalised their coffee range for Waitrose and Ocado and launched a new coffee subscription service known as CoffeeClub.

Certification Attained 
The UK specialty coffee roaster and direct trade pioneer has become the most recent coffee company to acquire the highly sought-after B Corp certification in recognition of its commitment to moral and sustainable business practises. A statement announcing Union Hand Roasted Coffee's B Corp status. The UK-based specialty coffee roaster and direct trade pioneer scored an astounding 106.3 out of a possible 200 points in recognition of its long-standing commitment to ethical commerce, environmental sustainability, and community-minded company practises.

Companies are certified as B Corps when they successfully complete a stringent audit process in five categories—governance, employees, community, environment, and customers—and obtain an overall score of 80. According to B Corp, over 4,900 companies have already received worldwide certification, with the typical company obtaining a score of 50.9.

On The High Street 
Union Coffee supplies wholesale specialty coffee and barista training Gail's Artisan Bakery, Brasserie Blanc and Peach Pubs.

References

Food and drink companies established in 2001
Coffee companies of the United Kingdom
Companies based in the London Borough of Newham